Jordan Doherty (born 29 August 2000) is an Irish professional footballer who plays as a midfielder or defender for Tampa Bay Rowdies in the USL Championship.

Club career 
After spending the 2019 season on loan with the Tampa Bay Rowdies, Doherty joined the team on a permanent basis on 24 January 2020. Following the 2021 season it was announced that Doherty would leave the Rowdies. Doherty signed with Irish club Bohemians in December 2021.

Doherty returned to the Rowdies on 12 January 2023.

References

External links
Profile at Football Database

2000 births
Living people
Sheffield United F.C. players
Tampa Bay Rowdies players
USL Championship players
Republic of Ireland association footballers
Republic of Ireland youth international footballers
Association football midfielders
Expatriate soccer players in the United States
Irish expatriate sportspeople in the United States
Republic of Ireland expatriate association footballers
Sportspeople from Fingal
Bohemian F.C. players